The Allaire DuPont Stakes is a Grade III American Thoroughbred horse race for fillies and mares age three and older over a distance of  miles (9 furlongs) run annually in mid May at Pimlico Race Course in Baltimore, Maryland.

History

Race name
Originally when inaugurated on 20 June 1992 the event was known as the Pimlico Distaff Handicap. In 2002 the event was renamed to the Pimlico Breeders' Cup Distaff Handicap and again renamed in 2006 in honor of the late Maryland horsewoman and owner of the great Kelso, Allaire duPont to the Allaire duPont Breeders' Cup Distaff Stakes. In 2008 the Breeders' Cup sponsorship ceased and  the name of the race reflected the change. In 2020 the event was run as the Allaire duPont Stakes.

Grade
The race was first awarded graded status in 1994 and then the race was upgraded from a Grade III to a Grade II event in 2007. The race was downgraded in 2011 to a Grade III event.

Distance
From 1992 through 2001, the race was contested at  miles and was shortened to  miles until 2014. In 2016 the distance was increased back to  miles.

Schedule
The inaugural running of the event was run in late June. In 1993 and 1994 the event was scheduled in May. Then it was moved to the Preakness undercard beginning in 1995 and currently it is held on Black-Eyed Susan Stakes day. In 2010 and 2014 the race was put on hiatus. Due to the COVID-19 pandemic in the United States the Preakness Carnival was moved to October but this event was not scheduled until late December at Laurel Park.

Records
Speed  record:
 miles: 1:47.64  – Mylady Curlin (2019)   
 miles: 1:42.43 – Buy The Barrell (2008)  

Margins:
  lengths – Terra Promessa (2017)

Most wins by a horse:
 2 – Stoneway Farm (2016, 2018)

Most wins by a jockey:
 4 – John R. Velazquez (2002, 2013, 2015, 2021)

Most wins by a trainer:
 4 – Todd A. Pletcher (2006, 2011, 2015, 2021)

Most wins by an owner:
 2 – Stoneway Farm (2016, 2018)

Winners

See also 
 Allaire duPont Distaff Stakes top three finishers
 List of American and Canadian Graded races

External sites
 Pimlico Race Course official website

References

Mile category horse races for fillies and mares
Graded stakes races in the United States
Pimlico Race Course
Horse races in Maryland
Recurring sporting events established in 1992
1992 establishments in Maryland
Grade 3 stakes races in the United States